Floribama Shore is an American reality television series that premiered on MTV on November 27, 2017, as a successor to Jersey Shore. The series was set in the Florida Panhandle along the beach that stretches all the way to Alabama. Floribama Shore documented eight young adults who live together during the summer on the Gulf Coast in Panama City Beach, Florida.

Production
Filming primarily took place in Florida with the first two seasons of the show in Panama City Beach and the third in St. Pete Beach. Due to the 2020 COVID-19 pandemic, the fourth season saw a location change to Missoula, Montana, Lake Havasu City, Arizona, and Athens, Georgia.

On January 8, 2018, MTV renewed the series for a second season, which premiered on July 9, 2018. On June 11, 2019, the series was renewed for a third season, which premiered on November 14, 2019, with a location change to St. Pete Beach, Florida. A fourth season was announced on January 26, 2021 and premiered on February 25, 2021. The season saw three new locations for the series (Missoula, Montana, Lake Havasu City, Arizona, and Athens, Georgia). The second part of fourth season premiered on September 16, 2021.

In November 2020, production of the fourth season halted for two weeks due to a production team member testing positive for COVID-19. 

In August 2022, it was reported that the series had been shelved indefinitely by the network.

Cast

Main
 Candace Rice
 Jeremiah Buoni
 Kirk Medas
 Codi Butts
 Kortni Gilson (seasons 1–3)
 Aimee Hall
 Nilsa Prowant
 Gus Smyrnios

Recurring
 Mattie Lynn Breaux (season 3)

Episodes

Series overview

Season 1 (2017–18)

Season 2 (2018–19)

Season 3 (2019–20)

Season 4 (2021)

Specials

Other appearances
Nilsa, Jeremiah, Aimee and Kirk competed in a special episode of Fear Factor against Deena Nicole Cortese, Snooki, Pauly D and Ronnie Ortiz-Magro from Jersey Shore: Family Vacation. Aimee and Nilsa appeared on first season of How Far Is Tattoo Far? Codi and Kirk appeared on second season of How Far Is Tattoo Far?  Mattie Lynn Breaux was a cast member on CMT's Party Down South. Smyrnios and Breaux appeared on the thirty-third season of The Challenge, with Breaux later returning to the competition for the thirty-fifth season.

References

External links

2017 American television series debuts
2021 American television series endings
2010s American reality television series
2020s American reality television series
English-language television shows
MTV reality television series
Television shows set in Florida
Television shows filmed in Florida